The town of Maruf is the district center of Maruf District, Kandahar Province, Afghanistan. It is the place where Ahmad Shah Durrani, the founder of Afghanistan, lived his last days and died on 16 October 1772.

Climate 
Maruf has a humid continental climate (Köppen: Dsa) with hot, dry summers and moderately cold winters.

References 

Populated places in Kandahar Province